Mohamed Moustafa Ahmed Abdall Metwally is an Egyptian Greco-Roman wrestler. He represented Egypt at the 2019 African Games held in Rabat, Morocco and he won one of the bronze medals in the 87 kg event.

He qualified at the 2021 African & Oceania Wrestling Olympic Qualification Tournament to represent Egypt at the 2020 Summer Olympics in Tokyo, Japan. He competed in the 87 kg event.

He competed in the 87kg event at the 2022 World Wrestling Championships held in Belgrade, Serbia.

Achievements

References

External links 
 

Living people
Place of birth missing (living people)
Egyptian male sport wrestlers
African Games bronze medalists for Egypt
African Games medalists in wrestling
Competitors at the 2019 African Games
African Wrestling Championships medalists
Wrestlers at the 2020 Summer Olympics
1995 births
Olympic wrestlers of Egypt
20th-century Egyptian people
21st-century Egyptian people